Brian Molony (22 November 1932 – 15 July 1995) was an Australian rules footballer who played with Carlton and St Kilda in the Victorian Football League (VFL).

Notes

External links 

Brian Molony's profile at Blueseum

1932 births
Carlton Football Club players
St Kilda Football Club players
Australian rules footballers from Victoria (Australia)
1995 deaths